More than 1,247 slang names have been identified for the dried leaves and flowers harvested from the cannabis plant for drug use, including:

Slang names for cannabis

Slang names for marijuana
Most slang names for cannabis date to the jazz era, when it was called Weed, Reefer, Gauge, Jive. Weed is a commonly used slang term for cannabis. New slang names, like trees, came into use early in the twenty-first century.

 2 long
 420
 Ace
 Airplane
 Alfalfa
 Alice B. Toklas
 Alligator cigarette
 Aloe Vera
 Amnesia
 Angola
 Ashes
 Asparagus
 Astro turf
 Atshitshi
 Aunt Mary
 Baby
 Babysitter
 Bag of bones
 Bamba
 Bambalacha
 Bhang
 Biggory
 Black bart
 Black gunion
 Blaze
 Blonde
 Blue sage
 Blunt
 Bo
 Bobo bush
 Bomb
 Boo
 Boof
 Boi
 Boo boo bama
 Boom
 Broccoli
 Bud
 Burnie
 Butter flower
 Butter weed
 Cabbage
 Canamo
 Canappa
 Cannon
 Catnip
 Cest
 Charge
 Cheeba
 Chira
 Chinese
 Christmas tree
 Chronic
 Churus
 Citrol
 Climb
 Cochornis
 Coliflor tostao (Spanish)
 Collie
 Crazy weed
 Crying weed
 Cryptonite
 Culican
 Dagga
 Da kine
 Dak
 Dank
 Dawamesk
 Devil's lettuce
 Dew
 Diambista
 Dimba
 Ding
 Dinkie dow
 Djamba
 Dody
 Doña Juanita ("Lady Jane" in Spanish)
 Doobie
 Dope
 Doradilla
 Draw
 Dyunk
 El Gallo (Spanish for "Rooster")
 Endo
 Esra
 Fatty
 Feeling
 Fine stuff
 Fir
 Flower
 Food
 Fu
 Gage or gauge
 Ganja
 Gash
 Ghana
 G!bb
 God's herb
 Gold star
 Golden
 Gonj
 Good giggles
 Gorge
 Grass
 Grata
 Green
 Green goddess
 Greta
 Griffa
 Grifo
 Gunga
 Gungeon
 Ham
 Hanhich
 Happy cigarette
 Hashish
 Hay
 Herb
 Holy weed
 Homegrown
 Hooch
 Houdini
 Indian boy
 Indian hemp
 Instaga
 Jan's lettuce
 Jane
 Jay
 Jazz cabbage
 Jazz cigarette
 Jive
 Joint
 Jolly green
 Joy smoke
 Kalakit
 Kaya
 KGB ("killer green bud")
 Kief
 Kilter
 Kind
 Krippy
 Kumba
 Kush
 L pape
 Laughing grass
 Left-handed cigarette
 Lima
 Llesca
 Loaf
 Lobo
 Loco weed
 Love weed
 Loud
 Macaroni
 Machinery
 Maconha
 Magic dragon
 Magic smoke
 Magical brownie
 Mary Jane
 Maui-wowie
 Meg
 Mohasky
 Mooster
 Mota
 MJ
 Mr Green
 Mu
 Muggle
 Nixon
 Pakalolo (Hawaiian for "crazy tobacco")
 Pinner
 Pot
 Pretendo
 Rainy day woman
 Rasta weed
 Reefer
 Reverend Green
 Righteous bush
 Roach
 Root
 Rope
 Rose marie
 Salad
 Salt and pepper
 Siddi
 Sinsemilla
 Sin Spinach
 Skunk
 Smoke
 Space cake
 Spliff
 Stash
 Sticky icky
 Stink weed
 Stogie
 Tea
 Taima
 Takkouri
 Tex-mex
 Thirteen
 Trauma
 Trees
 Unotque
 Wheat
 Wisdom weed
 Whacky tabacky
 Weed
 Zambi
 ZaZa
 Zoot
 Zol
 Zoo-Wee-Mama

Slang names for cannabis identified by the United States Drug Enforcement Administration
Whether all of these terms are slang names is disputed by some scholars, including writers at The Boston Globe and Reason Magazine. Slang names for cannabis that were identified by the Drug Enforcement Administration in 2017–2018 and are not corroborated by another source include:

 Alfombra
 Nate Jahiel
 All-Star
 Almohada
 Arizona ashes
 AZ
 Barbara Jean
 Bareta
 Bash
 Biggy
 Black Maria
 Blue Crush
 Blue jeans
 Chistosa
 Cotorritos
 Dizz
 Escoba
 Gallina
 Gato
 Green paint
 Grenuda
 Guardada
 Lechuga
 Lemon-Lime
 Liamba
 Lime Pillows
 Loud
 Mafafa
 Manteca
 Maracachafa
 Mariquita
 My Brother
 Narizona
 O-Boy
 Palm
 Platinum Jack
 Popcorn
 Shoes
 Shmagma
 Shora
 Shrimp
 Smoochy Woochy Poochy
 Tigitty
 Tila
 Tims
 Tosca
 Tristan kush
 Tweeds
 Valle
 Wooz
 Young Girls
 Zacate

Regional slang names

Hispanosphere 
Marihuana (and derivatives: maría, mariana, mari juana, marinola, maripepa, etc.), doña juana, ganja, grifa, yerba, hierba, yerbasanta, césped/pasto/zacate, orégano, 420, joint, etc.

 Mexico: mota, mostaza, shora, grifa, juanita, cucaracha, mafafa, etc.
 Spain: maría, yerba, grifa, ganja

Nigeria
Kaya, wee-wee, igbo, kush, oja, gbana, blau, kpoli and abana.

Sweden

Flower/fruit
 Grälle
 Gräs
 Gröning
 Grönt
 Marre
 Maja
 Ört

Hash
 Böj
 Braj
 Brass
 Brownie
 Brunt
 Knatch, knätch
 Svart
 Zattla
 Zütt

Slang names for good-quality cannabis

 BC bud
 Black gold
 Bud
 Buddha
 Chiba chiba
 Chronic
 Citrol
 Colas
 Dank
 Fine stuff
 Flower tops
 Ganja
 Gas
 Golden leaf
 Good stuff
 Hydro
 Kief
 Killer green bud (KGB)
 Kind bud
 Loud
 Nug
 Primo
 Righteous bush
 Sinsemilla
 Sup herb bowl
 Thai sticks
 White-haired lady
 Za Za

Slang names for poor-quality cannabis

 Bammies
 Bobby
 Boof
 Brown
 Bunk
 Cabbage
 Dirt grass
 Ditch weed
 Firewood
 Garbage
 Green
 Harsh
 Leaf
 Mids
 Nixon
 Ragweed
 Railroad weed
 Reggie
 Rope
 Rough stuff
 Scrub
 Schwag
 Shake
 Stems
 Swag
 Whack

Slang names for a cannabis cigarette

 2 long
 Airplane
 Alligator cigarette
 Bifter, bifta
Blunt
 Bomber
 Bone
 Camberwell carrot
 Cow
 Cripple
 Dart
 Doobie
 Earth
 Fatty
 Gasper
 Goof butt
 Gorilla finger
 Happy cigarette
 Hot stick
 J or Jay
 Jazz cigarette
 Joy stick
 L pape
 Left-handed cigarette
 Log
 Magic dragon
 Megg
 Number
 Panatella
 Phatty
 Pinner
 Pocket rocket
 Reefer
 Roach
 Spliff
 Stogie
 Stick
 Tommy Chong
 Torpedo
 Twist
 Weed Bunts
 Zoot

Slang names for a package or a specific amount of cannabis

 1 Key = 1 kilogram of brickweed
 40 Sack
 Bag
 Bale
 Brick
 Cube
 Dime bag
 Dollar
 Dub
 Eight ball
 Eighth
 Elbow
 Finger
 Lid
 Matchbox
 Nickel bag
 OZ
 Pack
 Q
 QP
 Quarter
 Stash
 Tin
 Zip

Slang names for consuming cannabis

 420
 Baking
 Blast
 Blaze
 Burn one
 Clam bake
 Fly Mexican airlines
 Get high
 Gooey (back and forth)
 Hit
 Hot box
 Puff the dragon
 Rip
 Session
 Tea party
 Toke
 Torch up
 Vape
 Wake and bake

Slang names for cannabis' effects

 Buzz
 Baked
 Cottonmouth
 Couch-lock
 Faded
 Fried
 High
 Lit up
 Mashed
 Munchies
 Nature's holiday
 Roasted
 Schmated
 Smacked
 Stoned
 Toasted
 Travis
 Wasted
 Zooted

Slang names for a person who consumes cannabis

 Baker
 Burnout
 Connoisseur
 Ent
 Doper
 Hippie
 Pothead
 Stoner
 Tea head
 Viper

See also

 Glossary of cannabis terms
 List of names for cannabis
 List of names for cannabis strains

References

External links
 Wiktionary Appendix of Cannabis Slang

 
Cannabis-related lists
 
Slang